Sadabad (also Romanized as Sa‘dābād) is a village in Anjirabad Rural District, in the Central District of Gorgan County, Golestan Province, Iran. At the 2006 census, its population was 1,746, in 476 families.

References 

Populated places in Gorgan County